Mercedes-EQ is a series of battery electric vehicles manufactured by Mercedes-Benz. The first model was previewed at the Paris Motor Show in 2016 with the Generation EQ concept vehicle. Mercedes-Benz intends to produce ten EQ models by 2022, three of which will have the Smart brand, representing between 15% and 25% of the company's global sales. All of Mercedes-Benz electric vehicle design and production efforts will target the EQ family.

Mercedes-Benz EQC, the first member of the EQ range, was presented at a special event in Stockholm in 2018.

Overview 
Mercedes-Benz intends to design and manufacture ten EQ models by 2022, all of which will be based on a single platform developed specifically for electric drivetrains, and which can be configured for any type of vehicle owing to modularization. Three models will have the Smart brand.

Dieter Zetsche, chairman of Daimler AG, stated that the new brand will consist of all Mercedes-Benz "electrification efforts", with a goal of having it represent between 15% and 25% of global sales for the company by 2025, dependent on "the continued development of infrastructure and customer preferences". Jurgen Schenk, a director of Daimler who will oversee the development of the electric vehicle program, stated that the company expects energy density improvements to battery technology to be about 14% per year until 2025, equivalent to improvements seen between 2010 and 2016.

To meet production targets, Daimler AG intends to invest €1 billion for capital expansion projects of its global battery production, half of which will be dedicated to its Deutsche ACCUmotive subsidiary lithium-ion battery manufacturing facilities in Kamenz, Germany. This is part of the company's investment of up to €10 billion for the design and development of electric vehicles.

The vehicles will use the Combined Charging System, a wall charger, or an optional wireless inductive charging system.

Models

EQC (2019–present) 

The EQC, the production version of the Generation EQ concept, is the first EQ model. It was unveiled in Stockholm, Sweden on 4 September 2018. It is a compact sport utility vehicle (SUV) and was released in 2019.

The vehicle has two electric motors, one on the front axle and one on the rear axle.

EQV (2020–present) 

The EQV is the second EQ model, which was unveiled at the 2019 Frankfurt Motor Show and previously seen as a concept at the 2019 Geneva International Motor Show. It is a minivan (MPV) scheduled for release in 2020.

The EQV is based on the V-Class and shares the same wheelbase dimensions.

It can be charged from 10 to 80 percent in 45 minutes, via a 110 kW DC fast charger or in less than 10 hours using an 11 kW AC charger.

The infotainment system is an EQ-specific version of Mercedes-Benz User Experience (MBUX) system and includes a 10-inch screen displaying charging current, energy flow and a consumption histogram, as well as navigation and driving modes.

EQA (2021–present) 

The EQA is an electric version of the second-generation GLA crossover SUV released in 2021, though the Concept EQA from 2017 was a hatchback with inspiration from the W177 A-Class.

EQB (2021–present) 

EQS and EQS SUV (2021–present) 

The EQS is an electric full-size luxury sedan intended to be the electric equivalent of the S-Class. It was introduced around 2021 and will be the first EQ model based on the dedicated EVA (Electric Vehicle Architecture) platform. Mercedes creates with the EQS a production car with the lowest cw-coefficient of 0.2. 

A SUV version Mercedes-Maybach EQS for 2022 was confirmed in October 2020. The EQS SUV was unveiled on 19 April 2022.

EQE and EQE SUV (2021–present) 

The EQE was revealed on September 5, 2021. EQE comes in 6 versions ( 300, 350, 350+, 500, AMG 43 and AMG 53). It is powered by a 90.8 kWh battery for all of the versions with a range of 500 to 660km and hp from 180kw up to 460kw depending on the version.

The EQE SUV was unveiled on October 16, 2022.

EQG 

Mercedes-Benz has indicated a preview of EQG, the G-Class concept car with pure electric drive, at the IAA Mobility 2021 in Munich. Externally, EQG does not look any different from G-Class models with internal combustion engines unlike the EQ models that have unique front design and dedicated platforms. EQG is the conversion of G-Class with dual electric motors and 108 kWH battery packs. The model names are EQG 560 4MATIC and EQG 580 4MATIC. The anticipated sales launch is 2022 or 2023.

EQT 
The EQT was revealed on December 2, 2022. The EQT drivetrain is identical to that of the contemporary Kangoo E-Tech.

Others
Another unannounced SUV will complete the ten all-electric EQ line-up.

Smart EQ

In March 2018, the three all-electric Smart models were rebranded to use the EQ brand, Smart EQ Fortwo, Smart EQ Fortwo Cabrio and the Smart EQ Forfour.

EQ hybrids
In addition to the EQ models, the EQ brand will be extended to the EQ Boost name being given to Mercedes-Benz models using the 48 volt mild hybrid system, while the third-generation of plug-in hybrids due from the end of 2018 will wear EQ Power badges. The new system mates a nine-speed automatic with the electric motor and clutch in the same unit, promising both considerably longer range in electric mode (up to 49 km) and a slightly faster  top speed.

EQ Silver Arrow Concept

It features a unique body style reminiscent of the 1950s and 1960s era Mercedes sports coupes and features a single center seat with a front visor for the driver. It also features a front fender LED panel that displays motion lighting.

Vision EQXX

Mercedes-Benz plans to go the full-electric route by 2030 and will soon present a concept car to demonstrate its leadership and capabilities when it comes to electric-vehicle technology.

The automaker has already provided glimpses of the concept, known as the Vision EQXX, and in November its R&D chief, Markus Schaefer, confirmed via a LinkedIn post that the reveal will take place on 3 January 2022. The car will highlight the automaker's stand at the Consumer Electronics Show, which kicks off in Las Vegas, Nevada, on 5 January.

Trademark dispute
In March 2017, Chinese automaker Chery filed a complaint with the Trademark Office of the State Administration for Industry and Commerce in China regarding the use of 'EQ', as Chery was using the name 'eQ' for an electric version of its QQ3 city car since 2015. The dispute was resolved in July 2017, with Chery retaining the rights to use 'eQ' with numerical models and Mercedes-Benz to use 'EQ' with alphabetical models.

Mercedes-Benz has trademarked the terms EQA, EQB, EQE, EQG, and EQS.

See also
 Volkswagen I.D. series
 Toyota bZ series
 Audi e-tron 
 BMW i

References

External links

 
 Electric mobility: Mercedes-Benz flips the switch: Generation EQ – mobility revisited at Daimler AG
 
 
 

EQ
EQ
Electric concept cars
Electric sports cars
Production electric cars
Mercedes-EQ